There were several special elections to the United States House of Representatives in 1923, spanning the 67th United States Congress and 68th United States Congress.

67th Congress 

|-
| 
| John I. Nolan
|  | Republican
| 1912
|  | Incumbent died November 18, 1922.New member elected January 23, 1923.Republican hold.Successor also elected to the next term, see below.
| nowrap | 

|}

68th Congress 

|-
| 
| John I. Nolan
|  | Republican
| 1912
|  | Incumbent member-elect died during previous congress.New member elected January 23, 1923.Republican hold.Successor also elected to finish the 67th Congress, see above.
| nowrap | 

|-
| 
| colspan=3 | Vacant
|  | Rep. James R. Mann died during previous congress.New member elected April 3, 1923.Republican gain.
| nowrap | 

|-
| 
| colspan=3 | Vacant
|  | Rep. Henry Z. Osborne died during previous congress.New member elected May 1, 1923.Republican gain.
| nowrap | 

|-
| 
| Horace M. Towner
|  | Republican
| 1910
|  | Incumbent resigned April 1, 1923 to become Governor of Puerto Rico.New member elected June 19, 1923.Republican hold.
| nowrap | 

|-
| 
| John M. C. Smith
|  | Republican
| 19101920 1921 
|  | Incumbent died March 30, 1923.New member elected June 19, 1923.Republican hold.
| nowrap | 

|-
| 
| John R. Tyson
|  | Democratic
| 1920
|  | Incumbent died March 27, 1923.New member elected August 14, 1923.Democratic hold.
| nowrap | 

|-
| 
| J. Stanley Webster
|  | Republican
| 1918
|  | Incumbent resigned May 8, 1923 to become a U.S. District Court Judge.New member elected September 25, 1923.Democratic gain.
| nowrap | 

|-
| 
| Lewis E. Sawyer
|  | Democratic
| 1922
|  | Incumbent died May 5, 1923.New member elected October 6, 1923.Democratic hold.
| nowrap | 

|-
| 
| J. Campbell Cantrill
|  | Democratic
| 1908
|  | Incumbent died September 2, 1923.New member elected November 30, 1923.Democratic hold.
| nowrap | 

|-
| 
| John W. Rainey
|  | Democratic
| 1918 
|  | Incumbent died May 4, 1923.New member elected November 6, 1923.Democratic hold.
| nowrap | 

|-
| 
| Daniel J. Riordan
|  | Democratic
| 18981900 1906 
|  | Incumbent died April 28, 1923.New member elected November 6, 1923.Democratic hold.
| nowrap | 

|-
| 
| colspan=3 | Vacant
|  | Rep. William Bourke Cockran died during previous congress.New member elected November 6, 1923.Democratic hold.
| nowrap | 

|-
| 
| James V. Ganly
|  | Democratic
| 1922
|  | Incumbent died September 7, 1923.New member elected November 6, 1923.Republican gain.
| nowrap | 

|-
| 
| Luther W. Mott
|  | Republican
| 1912
|  | Incumbent died September 7, 1923.New member elected November 6, 1923.Democratic hold.
| nowrap | 

|-
| 
| Claude Kitchin
|  | Democratic
| 1900
|  | Incumbent died May 31, 1923.New member elected November 6, 1923.Democratic hold.
| nowrap | 

|-
| 
| Porter H. Dale
|  | Republican
| 1914
|  | Incumbent resigned August 11, 1923 to run for U.S. Senator.New member elected November 6, 1923.Republican hold.
| nowrap | 

|-
| 
| Benjamin G. Humphreys II
|  | Democratic
| 1902
|  | Incumbent died October 16, 1923.New member elected November 27, 1923.Democratic hold.
| nowrap | 

|}

References 

 

 
1923